Mucel (or Mucellus) was a medieval Bishop of Hereford. He was consecrated between 857 and 866 and died between those same dates.

Citations

References

External links
 

Bishops of Hereford
9th-century English bishops
9th-century deaths
Year of birth unknown
Year of death uncertain